Pathonpatham Noottandu is a 2022 Indian Malayalam-language action period drama film written and directed by Vinayan. Set in the 19th century Travancore, the story is based on the life of Arattupuzha Velayudha Panicker, a warrior who fought against social injustices suffered by the lower caste. The film stars Siju Wilson in the lead role, alongside Kayadu Lohar, Anoop Menon, Chemban Vinod Jose, Deepti Sati, Poonam Bajwa, and Senthil Krishna in important roles. The background score was composed by Santhosh Narayanan and songs were composed by M. Jayachandran.

Pathonpatham Noottandu was released in theatres on 8 September 2022.

Plot 
A young Velayudha Chekavar from Arattupuzha arrives at the English East India Company headquarters at Travancore for asking a lord for a permit to export cardamom. There he watches a brutal fighting contested between slaves conducted by the English officers along with some nobles and other guests. When the winner is coerced by the officers to kill the loser by bludgeoning, Chekavar interferes and saves him, but a fight happens and Velayudha Chekavar manages to escape without getting shot.

The Maharaja of Travancore calls Velayudha Chekavar to the Durbar to ask his help to find and capture Kayamkulam Kochunni who stole sacred salagram ornaments from the Padmanabhaswamy Temple. The naduvazhi ministers and governors dissuade the Maharaja from enlisting him with the task because Velayudha Chekavar was a lower caste Ezhava. Since Kochunni assaulted Paachupanikkar, the commander-in-chief of Travancore Army, and his assistants during their attempt to capture him, Maharaja announces a reward of 100 gold coins to whoever gives information about Kochunni. Meanwhile, Kochunni who stole the chest of ornaments had hid it under the ground near the palace, he plans to recover it during the wedding celebration of prince.

Chekavar builds a Shiva temple for the lower caste people. He gets arrested for the same on the order of the Diwan as it was forbidden for the lower caste to worship an idol. While in jail, the deputy commander-in-chief, Padaveedan Nambi and the naduvazhi Panikkasseri Kaimal plans to poison Chekavar to death. Inspector Kannan Kurup, the son of former commander-in-chief comes in to the rescue of Chekavar and asks him not to have anything given by the jailors. The queen who knows about his arrest issues order to release him. The queen then meets him and asks his help to retrieve the stolen ornaments and capture Kochunni.

On the wedding evening, Kochunni arrives to retrieve the hidden chest. Kurup finds him and catches him but lets him free as Kochunni offers half the price of the ornaments. Kochunni and Kurup tries to sell the chest to Looper, an Englishman who exports ivory and antiques to England and France. Chekavar arrives there and defeats Kochunni and his team and retrieves the chest. Kurup and Looper escape. Kochunni gets jailed. Maharaja offers the reward of veera shringhala and 1008 gold coins, but his ministers advice him against giving it directly by the Mahraja conforming to untouchability law. Seeing this, Chekavar rejects the reward. To honour him, Maharaja confers him the title Panicker, thenceforth he is known as Arattupuzha Velayudha Panicker. Kurup meets Kochunni in jail and Kochunni offers him stolen gold coins in return for killing Velayudha Panicker.

Meanwhile injustice towards the lower caste continued. Women who wore the clothes that covered their ankles were beaten up with hot iron rods. The lords chopped off the noses of women who wore nose rings and chopped off the breasts of the women who covered their breasts. As a protest to all these Panicker proclaimed all women to cover their chests, wear long dothi and nose ring and perform Poothan dance during the Perumpoothan Thullal, a dance ritual. He provide garments and nose rings to all women.

During the ritual, Panikkasseri Kaimal and Padaveedan Nambi came with a team of police inspectors and started to beat up everyone. Panicker and Nangeli went on defending them. Nambi killed Panicker's grandfather, Perumal. In that fury Panicker killed Nambi. During that time Kurup and Kochunni's assistant, Bava came on horse back and fired at Panicker. Panicker followed them and caught Bava.

The next day in the durbar of the palace, Diwan and Kaimal requested the king to take necessary action against Panicker for breaking the ritual rules and for killing Nambi. Panicker came before the king and said that he is happy that he killed a traitor. Soon Bava was brought before the court. There he confessed that Nambi and the naduvazhi Chandrupilla leaked them the information about Paachupanikkar coming to Kayamkulam to captive Kochunni. He also said that they gave a reward of ten thousand gold coins for that information. Bava was jailed. Chandrupilla was sentenced to death for the treason while being a naduvazhi. He also announced that trial will continue the next day and only then the final verdict will be made.

Panicker and his people leave to Cherthala after his grandfather's cremation. There the idol installation at the temple takes place. Panicker plans to go to Ananthapuri. Kaimal and Raman Thambi buy off to Kandappan, Panicker's close aide, and he adds some powder in the tender coconut drink given to Panicker. He does the same in all the tender coconut drinks which were taken for the people who travel in boat. Kaimal executes Bava with the help of king's confidante Rudran. People in the boat start feeling drowsy during their journey. At that time, Kaimal and his team attack Panicker. He kills everyone, but bleeds to death. Later Nangeli is tied and beaten up for covering up her chest. Kelu, her father who came for her rescue is also tied and beaten. To save her father's life, she agrees to remove her upper cloth and to pay the breast tax. As a protest to this injustice, she herself chops her breasts and presents it before the governers. She soon bleed to death. Seeing her mutilated body, her lover Chirukkandan jumped into her funeral pyre.

The death of Panicker and Nangeli arouse fury and distress among the people. They attack the authorities and the landlords, and destroy shops and markets. To save Travancore from becoming a riotous land, the king abolishes the unjust taxes and grants women the right to cover their upper body.

Cast 
 
 Siju Wilson as Arattupuzha Velayudha Panicker, a wealthy trader and swordsman. 
 Kayadu Lohar as Nangeli
 Anoop Menon as Maharaja of Travancore Ayilyam Thirunal Rama Varma
 Chemban Vinod Jose as Kayamkulam Kochunni
 Deepti Sati as Savithri Thampuratti
 Poonam Bajwa as Queen of Travancore Mathruppillil Kalyanikutty Amma
 Renu Soundar as Neeli
 Senthil Krishna as Chirukandan
 Sudev Nair as Padaveedan Nambi
 Suresh Krishna as Panikkasseri Parameswara Kaimal
 Vishnu Vinay as Kannan Kurup
 Tini Tom as Kunju Pillai
 Gokulam Gopalan as Perumal
 Indrans as Kelu
 Manikandan R. Achari as Bava
 Ramu as Diwan
 Krishna as Diwan Peshkar Kalyana Krishnan
 Raghavan as Eeswaran Namboothiri
 Alencier Ley Lopez as Chandrakkaran Raman Thampi
 Sudheer Karamana as Pachupanicker, Chief of Travancore Army
 Varsha Viswanath as Janaki
 Madhuri Braganza as Katha
Musthafa as Kandappan
 Jaffar Idukki as Thandalkkaran Keshunni
 Shivaji Guruvayoor as Cherthala Naduvazhi
 Sunil Sukhada as Chandru Pillai
 Niya as Velutha
 Master Adhil Raj as Kunju
 Spadikam George as Diwan Peshkar Nanu Pillai
 Naseer Sankranthi as Konthikuruppu, Eeswaran Namboothiri's Assistant
 Jayakumar Parameswaran Pillai as Appu Kurup
 Koottickal Jayachandran as Achupilla, the translator
 Chali Pala as Nagan Pilla, the jailor 
 Vishnu Govindan as Chaathan
 V. K. Baiju as Komakuruppu
 Sruthi Roshan as Bhageerathi Thampuratti
 Krishnaprasadh as Narayanan Namboothiri
 Munshi Renjith as Karunan
 Biju Ezhuppunna as Panjupilla police
 Adinadu Sasi as Kittu
 Poojappura Radhakrishnan as Thanupilla
 Sharan Puthumana as the Thirumeni

Voice only
Mohanlal as Narrator (1st Half) 
Mammootty as Narrator (2nd Half)

Production 
Director Vinayan announced the film in March 2020 by making a casting call.

Filming
Pooja function of the film was held in Kochi in January 2021, but the shooting was delayed due to the COVID-19 pandemic. The first schedule of the shooting began in Palakkad and it lasted for about three months. The shooting was temporarily stopped after that, as the state was undergoing the second wave of COVID-19 pandemic. On June 27, 2021 Vinayan said that the editing works has started as they have shot about 80 percent of the movie. He also added that the shooting will resume after the descent of the second wave. The second and the final schedule of the shooting began on November 3, 2021. By sharing the last shot of the movie, Vinayan and Siju Wilson announced that the shooting of the movie was wrapped up on November 23, 2021. The Dolby Atmos mixing of the film was completed on 1 July 2022. The film was censored with U/A certificate on 20 August 2022.

Shaji Kumar was the cinematographer of the film. Vivek Harshan did the editing work on the film. Pattanam Rasheed handled the make-up and the costumes were arranged by Dhanya Bhalakrishnan. Ajayan Challissery was the art director of the movie. Mafia Sasi, Supreme Sundar and Rajashekar handled the action choreography of the movie. V. C. Praveen and Biju Gopalan are the co-producers of the movie and Badusha is the production controller.

Music 
The music composition of the film started on June 2020. The songs featured in the film are composed by M. Jayachandran and Rafeeq Ahamed is the lyricist. Santhosh Narayanan has done the background score of the film. The film marks his debut as a composer in the Malayalam film industry.

Release

Marketing

The teaser trailer of the film was released on June 3, 2022 through the official social media pages of celebrities including Mammootty and Mohanlal. The trailer of the movie was released on 20 August 2022. The theatrical trailer of the film was launched in the Metaverse as well. This was the first Malayalam movie trailer was released in metaverse.

Theatrical 
Initially the film was scheduled theatrical release on 8 September 2022 in Malayalam and dubbed versions of Hindi, Tamil, Telugu and Kannada languages simultaneously. The film was released in India and GCC on 8 September 2022. As the censoring of the dubbed copies was not completed the film was released only in Malayalam language on 8 September 2022. Later the film was released in dubbed versions Hindi, Tamil, Telugu and Kannada languages.

Home media
The film had its OTT premiere through Amazon Prime Video on 7 November 2022.

Reception
The Times of India rated the film 4 out of 5 stars and wrote "A heartfelt historical narrative". Onmanorama wrote "An exceptional treat from Vinayan, Siju Wilson". The Hindu wrote "A package with some punch, despite its failings".

Hindu Aikya Vedi said that there are historical inaccuracies in the film, saying that Nangeli's story is fictional and there was no tax on breast, and Velayudha Panicker was killed by his relative who converted to Islam. Vinayan addressed the accusations saying that he had taken artistic liberty and the film is not a documentary and has omitted some things.

References

External links 
 

Films directed by Vinayan
2020s Malayalam-language films
Indian historical drama films
Indian historical action films
Films set in the British Raj
History of Kerala on film
Films shot in Kerala
Films shot in Thrissur
Films shot in Palakkad
Films shot in Alappuzha
Films scored by M. Jayachandran